The 2018–19 UNLV Lady Rebels basketball team will represent the University of Nevada, Las Vegas during the 2018–19 NCAA Division I women's basketball season. The Lady Rebels, led by eleventh year head coach Kathy Olivier. They play their home games at the Cox Pavilion, attached to the Thomas & Mack Center on UNLV's main campus in Paradise, Nevada. They were a member of the Mountain West Conference. They finished the season 12–18, 10–8 in Mountain West play to finish in a tie for fifth place. They lost in the quarterfinals Mountain West women's tournament to Fresno State.

Roster

Schedule

|-
!colspan=9 style=| Non-conference regular season

|-
!colspan=9 style=| Mountain West regular season

|-
!colspan=9 style=| Mountain West Women's Tournament

See also
2018–19 UNLV Runnin' Rebels basketball team

References 

UNLV
UNLV Lady Rebels basketball seasons
Rebels
Rebels